de Rosnay is a French surname and may refer to:

 Gaëtan de Rosnay (1912–1992), French painter
 Joël de Rosnay (born 1937), Mauritian-born French science writer, and molecular biologist
 Jenna de Rosnay (born 1963), American windsurfer, fashion designer, and model
 Tatiana de Rosnay (born 1961), Franco-British writer
 Xavier de Rosnay, member of the French electronic-house duo Justice

See also
 Drosnay, a commune in Marne, France